Stephen Mack Shields (born November 30, 1958) is a former Major League Baseball relief pitcher. He was drafted by the Boston Red Sox in the 10th round of the 1977 amateur draft, and played for five different teams between 1985 and 1989. He lives with his family in Hokes Bluff, Alabama. Shields is a 1977 graduate of Hokes Bluff High School.

In 219 innings pitched over five seasons, Shields posted an 8-8 won-loss record with a 5.26 ERA and 126 strikeouts.

References

External links

1958 births
Atlanta Braves players
Kansas City Royals players
Seattle Mariners players
New York Yankees players
Minnesota Twins players
Living people
Major League Baseball pitchers
Sportspeople from Gadsden, Alabama
Baseball players from Alabama